Boris Sekulić (born 21 October 1991) is a professional footballer who plays as a defender for Polish club Górnik Zabrze. Born in Serbia, he represents the Slovakia national team.

Club career
Born in Zemun, Sekulić started his career playing in the youth team of local club FK Zemun. In 2009 he became senior and played on loan at Grafičar Beograd. Next season he signed with Beograd.

In the summer of 2011 he moved abroad to Slovakia and joined Košice at the age of 19. Sekulić was a stable player for Košice Reserves, making 13 appearances. On 3 March 2012, he made his debut for the first team, playing ninety minutes of a derby match, in a 1–0 away win against Tatran Prešov.

On 20 June 2018, Sekulić signed with Bulgarian First League side CSKA Sofia, after a three-year spell with Slovan Bratislava, during which he obtained Slovak citizenship.

On 15 February 2020, Sekulić moved to Major League Soccer side Chicago Fire on a three-year deal. On 11 October 2020 he scored his first MLS goal against D.C. United at Soldier Field. He left Chicago following the expiration of his contract at the end of the 2022 season.

On 17 February 2023, Sekulić returned to Górnik Zabrze on an eighteen-month contract.

International career
In August 2017, Sekulić obtained Slovak citizenship, making him eligible to represent Slovakia and in March 2018 he was called up to the national team by his former coach at MFK Košice, Ján Kozák, for two fixtures at 2018 King's Cup. Although he was benched in the semi-final 2–1 win over UAE, he played the entire final game against Thailand (3–2 win) as a right-back.

Career statistics

Club

Honours
Košice
Slovnaft Cup: 2013–14

Slovan Bratislava
Slovnaft Cup: 2016–17, 2017–18

Slovakia
King's Cup: 2018

References

External links
 MFK Košice profile
 
 Corgoň Liga profile
 

1991 births
Living people
Serbian footballers
Slovak footballers
People from Zemun
Slovak people of Serbian descent
Slovakia international footballers
Naturalized citizens of Slovakia
Association football defenders
FK Zemun players
RFK Grafičar Beograd players
FK Beograd players
FC VSS Košice players
ŠK Slovan Bratislava players
PFC CSKA Sofia players
Górnik Zabrze players
Chicago Fire FC players
Slovak Super Liga players
2. Liga (Slovakia) players
First Professional Football League (Bulgaria) players
Ekstraklasa players
Major League Soccer players
Serbian expatriate footballers
Slovak expatriate footballers
Serbian expatriate sportspeople in Slovakia
Expatriate footballers in Slovakia
Expatriate footballers in Bulgaria
Slovak expatriate sportspeople in Bulgaria
Serbian expatriate sportspeople in Bulgaria
Expatriate footballers in Poland
Slovak expatriate sportspeople in Poland
Serbian expatriate sportspeople in  Poland
Expatriate soccer players in the United States
Slovak expatriate sportspeople in the United States
Serbian expatriate sportspeople in the United States
Naturalised association football players